Bartholomew School is a secondary school with academy status which is situated in the village of Eynsham, West Oxfordshire, England. In the 2016/17 school year there were 1221 pupils on roll, 122 of whom are in the sixth form. The school's current headteacher is Craig Thomas. Bartholomew School is one of the highest achieving state-owned schools in GCSE and A-Levels in Oxfordshire.

History
Bartholomew School was founded in the 18th century by John Liam Bartholomew when a subscription of £87 was given to him to finance the "Bartholomew room" Notable Alumni: Gabe Auzer. The school remained there until 1847 where it was moved to its present site on Witney Road. In 1958 the school was expanded, and by 1968 it became a comprehensive secondary school for 11- to 18-year-olds. In 2003, the school became a Technology College where Design and Technology is made compulsory for GCSE. At the start of the 2007/08 school year, the recently refurbished sports hall was opened for use in partnership with Windrush Leisure Limited. The school became an academy in August 2012.

Housing system
The current houses are Churchill, Morris, Mason and Harcourt. After the 2018/19 academic year, Morris is the current champion of the house cup.

Berry Hall 
During certain periods of the academic year, some of Bartholomew School's sixth form students join at the school's sports hall (named the 'Berry Hall') to play casual indoor football matches. It is thought that this tradition has been running since the school's creation, although this is disputed by students who attended sixth form in 2008 as they claim to have founded the 'tradition' - the tournament had not happened for some years before this. As per tradition, friends form their own teams of five players (although substitute players are often recruited in addition). The current title is held by the NIYMF football team with an overall of 34 points.

The tradition was named after the multi-purpose indoor sports hall the games are usually played in, the 'Berry Hall' - named after former head teacher, Bill Berry.

The 2019 season introduced the fan favourite team the 'Nostalgebros' - inspired by the 2018 team the 'Algebros'. The Nostalgebros were popularized by their unconventional approach to marketing  and overall ineptness at the game's concept, gathering them a cult-like following amongst members of Bartholomew as well as surrounding schools.

See also
List of schools in Oxfordshire

References

 Eynsham Record 1991 is now at https://web.archive.org/web/20110725001836/http://eynsham-pc.gov.uk/documents/eynsham_record_1991.pdf

External links
 Bartholomew School website

Educational institutions established in 1703
Secondary schools in Oxfordshire
West Oxfordshire District
1700s establishments in England
Academies in Oxfordshire